The ENKA Open is a defunct WTA Tour affiliated tennis tournament played in 1998. It was held in Istanbul in Turkey and played on outdoor hard courts.

Results

Singles

Doubles

References
 WTA Results Archive

 
Hard court tennis tournaments
Tennis tournaments in Turkey
WTA Tour
Defunct tennis tournaments in Europe
Defunct sports competitions in Turkey